Meera Nanda (born 1954) is an Indian writer and historian of science, who has authored several works critiquing the influence of Hindutva, postcolonialism and postmodernism on science, and the flourishing of pseudoscience and vedic science. In 2019-20, she was a Guest Faculty in Humanities and Social Sciences at IISER Pune.

Life and career 

Nanda was educated in science and philosophy with a PhD in biotechnology from the Indian Institute of Technology, Delhi, and a PhD in science studies from Rensselaer Polytechnic Institute.

She was a John Templeton Foundation Fellow in Religion and Science (2005–2007). In January 2009, she was a Fellow at the Jawaharlal Nehru Institute for Advanced Study, in the Jawaharlal Nehru University for research in Science, Post-Modernism and Culture. She was also a visiting faculty of history and philosophy of science at Indian Institute of Science Education and Research, Mohali from 2010 to 15 May 2017. She was a visiting faculty member of the department of Humanities and Social Sciences, IISER Pune in 2019 and 2020.

Religion and Hindu nationalism
Nanda has authored several works on religion, most notably Prophets Facing Backward: Postmodern Critiques of Science and Hindu Nationalism in India (2004), and her 2009 book The God Market which examined how India is experiencing a rising tide of popular Hinduism, including government financing of Hinduism despite the nation's secular characteristic. The book was reviewed by William Dalrymple in Outlook Magazine.

Works
 Postmodernism and Religious Fundamentalism: A Scientific Rebuttal To Hindu Science. New Delhi: Navayana. 2000. 
 Breaking the Spell of Dharma and Other Essays. New Delhi: Three Essays Collective, 2002. .
 Prophets Facing Backward: Postmodern Critiques of Science and the Hindu Nationalism in India. New Brunswick: Rutgers University Press, 2004. . Excerpts
 Wrongs of the Religious Right: Reflections on secularism, science and Hindutva. New Delhi: Three Essays Collective, 2005. 
 The God Market. Random House, 2010. .
 Ayurveda Today : A Critical Look, with C. Viswanathan. Penguin, 2010. .
 Science in Saffron: Skeptical Essays on History of Science. New Delhi: Three Essays Collective, 2016. .

References

Further reading
 Society/Essays: Sangh Parivar, The Pizza-Maker, (2003) Outlook
 ESSAY: Postmodernism, Hindu nationalism and `Vedic science' (2003) Part 1 and Part 2, Frontline
  Frontline
 DEBATE: Vedic creationism in America. (2006) Frontline
 Book Review: "The God Market: How Globalization is making India more Hindu" (2010) 
 Hindutva's science envy, Frontline September 16, 2016

External links

 Science in Saffron, publisher's page.
 Science in Saffron at researchgate.net.

Living people
Academic staff of Jawaharlal Nehru University
Philosophers of science
IIT Delhi alumni
Rensselaer Polytechnic Institute alumni
Indian women philosophers
21st-century Indian philosophers
Political philosophers
American women writers of Indian descent
1954 births
21st-century Indian women scientists
21st-century Indian scientists
Writers about Hindu nationalism
20th-century American philosophers
American women philosophers
Biotechnologists
Women biotechnologists
Critics of postmodernism
21st-century Indian women writers
21st-century Indian writers
20th-century Indian women writers
20th-century Indian writers
20th-century Indian women scientists
20th-century Indian scientists
20th-century American women
21st-century American women
Indian women political writers
Indian political writers
Indian political philosophers
American women non-fiction writers